Greenfield Residential Historic District is a national historic district located at Greenfield, Hancock County, Indiana. The district encompasses 523 contributing buildings, 1 contributing site, and 15 contributing structures in a predominantly residential section of Greenfield. It developed between about 1880 and 1947, and includes notable examples of Greek Revival, Gothic Revival, Italianate, Queen Anne, Colonial Revival, Neoclassical, Mission Revival, and Bungalow / American Craftsman style architecture. Located in the district are the separately listed Charles Barr House and James Whitcomb Riley House.  Other notable buildings are St. Michael's Catholic Church (1898), Shiloh Primitive Baptist Church (c. 1900), Chair Factory (c. 1880), Friends Meeting House (c. 1890), and two Lustron houses (c. 1947).

It was listed on the National Register of Historic Places in 2011.

References

Historic districts on the National Register of Historic Places in Indiana
Houses on the National Register of Historic Places in Indiana
Greek Revival architecture in Indiana
Gothic Revival architecture in Indiana
Italianate architecture in Indiana
Queen Anne architecture in Indiana
Colonial Revival architecture in Indiana
Mission Revival architecture in Indiana
Historic districts in Hancock County, Indiana
National Register of Historic Places in Hancock County, Indiana